Poly Wells Field is the home stadium for the Division I (NCAA) Abilene Christian Wildcats softball team. The stadium is located on the campus of Abilene Christian University in Abilene, Texas.  Amenities include bleacher seating for 1,000 fans; field lighting; an electronic scoreboard; dugouts; batting cages outside of the right field line; restrooms; and locker rooms.  The entire playing surface was changed from natural grass to AstroTurf in 2015–16.  Brown turf was installed in the infield, and green turf was installed in the outfield.  The dugout surfaces were raised to field level prior to the AstroTurf installation.

The full name of the stadium is A.E. (Poly) and Zieta Wells Field in honor of an estate donation made by Zieta Wells.  Official stadium dedication was held on March 29, 1997.  The initial home game was played on February 22, 1997 Texas Wesleyan.

The stadium was the home of 2009 Lone Star Conference softball tournament.

Yearly Attendance

Below is the Wildcats' home attendance at Poly-Wells Field since the 2010 season.

As of the 2014–15 season.

References

External links
 Abilene Christian Wildcats Softball Official Website

Abilene Christian Wildcats softball
College softball venues in the United States
Softball venues in Texas
Sports venues completed in 1997
1997 establishments in Texas